Shield Nunatak is a prominent nunatak standing at the east side of the terminus of Campbell Glacier on the north shore of Terra Nova Bay, Victoria Land. This feature, a multiple volcanic cone, was so named by the New Zealand Geological Survey Antarctic Expedition (NZGSAE), 1965–66, because it looks like an old Viking shield.

Shield Nunatak is described as a basalt tuya in the Encyclopedia of Quaternary Science.

References

Nunataks of Victoria Land
Scott Coast
Tuyas of Antarctica
Quaternary volcanoes
Volcanoes of Victoria Land